Steroh is a coastal town in southern Socotra, (De jure) Yemen.

References

Socotra Governorate
Populated places in Socotra
Populated coastal places in Yemen